James Edward "Jes" Staley (born December 27, 1956) is an American banker, and the former group chief executive of Barclays. He stood down as CEO on November 1, 2021, and was succeeded by C. S. Venkatakrishnan. Staley has nearly four decades of experience in banking and financial services. He spent 34 years at J.P. Morgan's investment bank, ultimately becoming CEO. In 2013, he moved to BlueMountain Capital, and in December 2015, became CEO of Barclays. In November 2021, Staley resigned amid a regulatory probe into whether he mischaracterized his relationship with the financier and sex offender Jeffrey Epstein.

Early life
His father, Paul R. Staley, was president and CEO of PQ Corporation, a chemicals company, who eventually settled the family outside of Philadelphia, Pennsylvania. His grandfather, Edward Staley, was the top executive of W.T. Grant at the time when the company filed for bankruptcy in 1976. His brother, Peter Staley, is an AIDS activist. His maternal grandfather was James Rhyne Killian, who served as the President of Massachusetts Institute of Technology from 1948 until 1959.

Staley graduated cum laude from Bowdoin College with a degree in economics.

Career
In 1979, after graduation, Staley joined Morgan Guaranty Trust Co. of New York. From 1980 to 1989, he worked in the bank's Latin America division, where he served as head of corporate finance for Brazil and general manager of the company's Brazilian brokerage firm. In the early 1990s, Staley became one of the founding members of J.P. Morgan's equities business and ran the Equity Capital Market and Syndicate groups. In 1999, he became head of the bank's Private Banking division which, under his leadership, improved profitability threefold during two years. In 2001, he was promoted to CEO of J.P. Morgan Asset Management and ran the division until 2009. During his tenure, J.P. Morgan Asset Management's client assets expanded from $605 billion to nearly $1.3 trillion. Staley has also been noted for his work on J.P. Morgan's strategic investment in Highbridge Capital Management by being named as one of the twenty hedge fund superstars at J.P. Morgan. His contribution to J.P. Morgan becoming an LGBT friendly company was also recognized. In 2009, Staley was promoted to Chief Executive of the Investment Bank. In this position, Staley was responsible for overseeing and coordinating the firm's international efforts across all lines of business.

In 2013, Staley left J.P. Morgan after more than 30 years to join BlueMountain Capital as a managing partner. In May 2015, he was elected to the board of directors of the Swiss global financial services company UBS as a new member of the Human Resources and Compensation Committee and of the Risk Committee. However, on October 28, 2015, it was announced that Staley would become group chief executive of Barclays, effective December 1, 2015. To avoid any conflicts of interest, UBS accepted his resignation from all of his functions at UBS with immediate effect.

In 2015, Staley spent £6.4m buying 2.8m shares in Barclays at 233p. Barclays has a policy that directors should own shares worth four times their salaries, which Staley achieved, as his salary amounted to £1.2m. However, his total remuneration package, including his salary, a fixed pay allowance to avoid an EU cap on bonuses, annual bonuses of up to £2.1m and a long-term incentive plan of £3.2m, was worth £10m in 2015. In March 2016, he gave his vision for the future of Barclays' investment bank, although the changes he brought until then were not well received by the markets.

Staley is a former trustee of Bowdoin College, serves on the board of the United States-China Business Council, and is a member of the advisory board of the American Museum of Natural History.

Controversies

Attempt to unmask whistleblower 
In 2016, Staley's attempts to discover the identity of a whistleblower who wrote a letter raising “concerns of a personal nature” senior employee. These claims were investigated for over a year by British regulators, an investigation which was one of the first tests of the UK's "Senior managers regime", intended to make high-level banking officials personally accountable. On April 20, 2018, the Financial Conduct Authority and the Prudential Regulatory Authority announced that Staley could stay on as CEO, though he would have to pay a fine. Staley was fined £642,430 by the FCA and Barclays said it would cut £500,000 of his bonus over the matter. In May 2017, "email prankster" James Linton began his spree with Staley pranked with an acrostic alluding to the whistleblower affair.

Relationship with Jeffrey Epstein 
On October 24, 2015, the Daily Mail published an article saying they had seen emails by Jeffrey Epstein indicating he "began arguing for Mr Staley in financial circles in the summer of 2012" while Barclays was searching for a new CEO. The Times reported that Barclays denied being lobbied by Epstein on behalf of Staley, and that Staley is said to have been unaware that Epstein was backing him for the role.
In February 2020, the FCA announced an investigation into whether Staley was "fit and proper" to lead Barclays, due to concerns over his previous disclosures of his relationship with Jeffrey Epstein. Staley told Bloomberg TV that "The investigation is actually focused on transparency, and whether I was transparent and open with the bank and with the board with respect to my relationship with Jeffrey Epstein." Staley told colleagues that he expects to leave Barclays by the end of 2021. On 1 November 2021, Staley announced his departure from Barclays, as a result of his associations with Epstein. It was reported that Staley and Epstein exchanged 1,200 emails over the course of four years. In this correspondence, Staley used a mystery phrase "Snow White"; the meaning of which has not been established.

On February 23, 2022, Barclays froze £22 million worth of bonuses for Staley pending investigation into his links to Epstein by the FCA and the PRA. In January 2023, it was reported that Staley was named in a lawsuit against JP Morgan which alleged that JP Morgan enabled Epstein behaviour. The suit alleged Staley knew Epstein was trafficking women and that he personally witnessed Epstein abusing an underage girl.

Personal life
Staley met his wife Debora Nitzan Staley soon after starting work in South America, "I was Unitarian Boston American and she was Jewish Brazilian São Paulo ... I was her parents' worst nightmare." The family has two daughters, and maintains residences on Park Avenue, New York City, and Southampton, Long Island. Staley is a Boston Red Sox fan. In the past, he has donated money to the Democratic Senatorial Committee. Staley has also reportedly been a big advocate for diversity since discovering that his brother Peter Staley had been diagnosed with HIV. He helped push the diversity agenda at J.P. Morgan.

As of May 2017, Staley was backing his brother-in-law Jorge Nitzan in a dispute that Aceco, a Brazilian technology company founded by the Nitzan family, has with the private equity firm KKR, also an important client of Barclays. In turn, KKR stopped inviting Barclays to participate in its deal making.

References

External link

 
American bankers
American chief executives of financial services companies
Bowdoin College alumni
JPMorgan Chase people
1956 births
Living people
Businesspeople from Boston
Barclays people